Biogeosciences is an open-access peer-reviewed scientific journal of the European Geosciences Union launched in 2004 by editors-in-chief Jean-Pierre Gattuso and Jürgen Kesselmeier. It covers all aspects of the interactions between the biological, chemical, and physical processes in terrestrial or extraterrestrial life with the geosphere, hydrosphere, and atmosphere. It cuts across the boundaries of established sciences and achieve an interdisciplinary view of these interactions.

Abstracting and indexing  
This journal is indexed in the following databases:

According to the Journal Citation Reports, the journal has a 2020 impact factor of 4.295.

References

External links 
 

Earth and atmospheric sciences journals
Publications established in 2004
English-language journals
Open access journals
Creative Commons Attribution-licensed journals
European Geosciences Union academic journals
Copernicus Publications academic journals